The New Zealand Constitution Amendment (Request and Consent) Act 1947 (New Zealand public act no. 38) and New Zealand Constitution (Amendment) Act 1947 (10 & 11 Geo. VI c. 46) were two enactments passed by the Parliament of New Zealand and Parliament of the United Kingdom respectively. The Acts contributed to the independence of New Zealand, by granting the Parliament of New Zealand the complete ability to amend the New Zealand Constitution Act 1852, an enactment of the Parliament of the United Kingdom which established the institutions of responsible government in New Zealand.

Background

When the New Zealand Constitution Act 1852 was passed, the General Assembly established under the Act was unable to amend or repeal the Act. In 1857 the Parliament of the United Kingdom passed the New Zealand Constitution (Amendment) Act 1857, which allowed the New Zealand General Assembly the ability to amend certain provisions of the Act. This was taken up by the New Provinces Act 1858, and eventually the Abolition of the Provinces Act 1867.

When New Zealand adopted the Statute of Westminster 1931 with the Statute of Westminster Adoption Act 1947, the Parliament of New Zealand gained the ability to amend all enactments that were passed for New Zealand by the British Parliament. As the 1857 Act barred the Parliament of New Zealand from amending the sections of the Constitution Act relating to parliament itself, the New Zealand Parliament passed the New Zealand Constitution Amendment (Request and Consent) Act 1947. This was largely due to the desire of the opposition to abolish the New Zealand Legislative Council, the upper house, which was barred by the 1857 Act.

Effect

The New Zealand Constitution Amendment (Request and Consent) Act 1947, requested that the Parliament of the United Kingdom amend the New Zealand Constitution Act 1852, and consented to such changes (as required by the Statute of Westminster Adoption Act 1947). This is the only example of the Parliament of New Zealand requesting the Parliament of the United Kingdom to legislate on New Zealand's behalf.

The British Parliament consented to the request by passing the New Zealand Constitution (Amendment) Act 1947. The British Act was granted Royal Assent on 10 December 1947. The Legislative Council was abolished in 1951.

In the 1980s, Canada, Australia, and New Zealand severed their last remaining constitutional links to the United Kingdom. However, Canada and Australia could not amend their constitutions without British approval. When Canada passed the Constitution Act, 1982, it had to be approved by the British Parliament in the Canada Act 1982. The Australia Act 1986 was also passed by both the Australian and British Parliaments. However, the New Zealand Constitution (Amendment) Act 1947 fully allowed New Zealand to amend its own constitution without British approval. Therefore, the New Zealand Parliament could pass the Constitution Act 1986 without the need of approval by the British Parliament.

Repeal

The Acts were repealed as an element of New Zealand law by section 28 of the Constitution Act 1986.

The UK act was repealed as an element of UK law by the Statute Law (Repeals) Act 1989.

See also

 Constitution of New Zealand
 Independence of New Zealand

References

External links
 Text of the New Zealand Constitution Amendment (Request and Consent) Act 1947
 Text of the New Zealand Constitution (Amendment) Act 1947 (UK)
 New Zealand Parliament - New Zealand sovereignty: 1857, 1907, 1947, or 1987?

Constitution of New Zealand
British Empire
History of the Commonwealth of Nations
Independence acts in the Parliament of the United Kingdom
United Kingdom Acts of Parliament 1947
1947 in New Zealand law
Repealed New Zealand legislation
1947 in international relations
New Zealand–United Kingdom relations
Acts of the Parliament of the United Kingdom concerning New Zealand
New Zealand and the Commonwealth of Nations
United Kingdom and the Commonwealth of Nations